Addison Transit Center is a bus-only station located along Quorum Drive and Addison Road in Addison, Texas (USA). The station opened in 1999.

This transit center will become a rail station on the Silver Line when that line is completed. Completion of the Silver Line has faced several delays, with service having previously been delayed from 2022 to 2024. In January 2023, further delays placed the anticipated service date in late 2025 to mid-2026.

The bus routes within the transit center serves Addison Circle Park as well as The Galleria of Dallas and Valley View Center.

References

External links 
Dallas Area Rapid Transit - Addison Transit Center

Dallas Area Rapid Transit commuter rail stations
Proposed railway stations in the United States
1999 establishments in Texas
Addison, Texas
Bus stations in Texas
Railway stations scheduled to open in 2025
Railway stations scheduled to open in 2026